McHenry County is a county in the U.S. state of North Dakota. As of the 2020 census, the population was 5,345. Its county seat is Towner.

McHenry County is part of the Minot, ND Micropolitan Statistical Area.

History
The Dakota Territory legislature created the county on January 4, 1873, with territory annexed from Bottineau County. It was named for James McHenry, an early settler of Vermillion (in present South Dakota). The county government was not organized at that time, nor was the county attached to another county for administrative and judicial purposes. The county organization was effected on October 15, 1884. The county boundaries were altered in 1885, 1887, 1891, and in 1892. It has retained its present boundaries since 1892.

When the county was organized in 1884, Villard was named as county seat. In 1885 this designation was moved to Scriptown. In 1886 the designation was again moved, to Towner, which has remained the seat to the present time (the two former sites are now ghost towns).

Geography
The Souris River loops through the county before turning north to its eventual discharge into Lake Winnipeg. The Wintering River drains the southern part of the county. The county terrain consists of rolling hills, partly devoted to agriculture (including limited use of center pivot irrigation). The terrain slopes to the north and east, with its highest point on the west boundary line near the southwest corner, at 2,156' (657m) ASL. In 2013, 131 plants were collected in the Lake George area.

Major highways

  U.S. Highway 2
  U.S. Highway 52
  North Dakota Highway 14
  North Dakota Highway 19
  North Dakota Highway 41
  North Dakota Highway 53
  North Dakota Highway 97

Adjacent counties

 Bottineau County - north
 Pierce County - east
 Sheridan County - southeast
 McLean County - southwest
 Ward County - west
 Renville County - northwest

National protected areas

 Cottonwood Lake National Wildlife Refuge
 Denbigh Experimental Forest
 J. Clark Salyer National Wildlife Refuge (part)
 Wintering River National Wildlife Refuge

Lakes

 Bromley Lake
 Buffalo Lodge Lake
 Connia Slough
 Erickson Lake
 Heringen Lake
 Horseshoe Lake (part)
 Lake George
 Lake Hester
 Lauinger Lake
 Martin Lake
 North Lake
 Potters Lake
 Round Lake
 Smoky Lake (part)
 Stevens Slough
 Stink Lake

Demographics

2000 census
As of the 2000 census, there were 5,987 people, 2,526 households, and 1,699 families in the county. The population density was 3.19/sqmi (1.23/km2). There were 2,983 housing units at an average density of 1.59/sqmi (0.61/km2). The racial makeup of the county was 98.73% White, 0.08% Black or African American, 0.40% Native American, 0.03% Asian, 0.05% from other races, and 0.70% from two or more races. 0.40% of the population were Hispanic or Latino of any race. 45.4% were of German and 34.0% Norwegian ancestry.

There were 2,526 households, out of which 28.3% had children under the age of 18 living with them, 58.2% were married couples living together, 5.6% had a female householder with no husband present, and 32.7% were non-families. 29.8% of all households were made up of individuals, and 15.40% had someone living alone who was 65 years of age or older. The average household size was 2.35 and the average family size was 2.92.

The county population contained 24.0% under the age of 18, 5.9% from 18 to 24, 23.3% from 25 to 44, 25.1% from 45 to 64, and 21.8% who were 65 years of age or older. The median age was 43 years. For every 100 females there were 103.9 males. For every 100 females age 18 and over, there were 101.0 males.

The median income for a household in the county was $27,274, and the median income for a family was $35,676. Males had a median income of $25,740 versus $18,505 for females. The per capita income for the county was $15,140. About 12.0% of families and 15.8% of the population were below the poverty line, including 18.5% of those under age 18 and 16.8% of those age 65 or over.

2010 census
As of the 2010 census, there were 5,395 people, 2,377 households, and 1,527 families in the county. The population density was 2.88/sqmi (1.11/km2). There were 2,948 housing units at an average density of 1.57/sqmi (0.61/km2). The racial makeup of the county was 97.8% white, 0.6% American Indian, 0.3% Asian, 0.1% black or African American, 0.3% from other races, and 0.9% from two or more races. Those of Hispanic or Latino origin made up 1.5% of the population. In terms of ancestry, 55.3% were of German, 39.5% Norwegian, 5.3% English, 3.6% Swedish, 3.5% American, 2.4% Russian and 1.7% Dutch ancestry.

Of the 2,377 households, 25.3% had children under the age of 18 living with them, 53.9% were married couples living together, 5.8% had a female householder with no husband present, 35.8% were non-families, and 31.3% of all households were made up of individuals. The average household size was 2.25 and the average family size was 2.81. The median age was 46.2 years.

The median income for a household in the county was $36,944 and the median income for a family was $54,350. Males had a median income of $36,625 versus $26,205 for females. The per capita income for the county was $22,911. About 6.4% of families and 12.3% of the population were below the poverty line, including 17.1% of those under age 18 and 17.9% of those age 65 or over.

Communities

Cities

 Anamoose
 Balfour
 Bantry
 Bergen
 Deering
 Drake
 Granville
 Karlsruhe
 Kief
 Towner (county seat)
 Upham
 Velva
 Voltaire

Unincorporated communities

 Berwick
 Cole Ford
 Denbigh
 Funston
 Genoa
 Guthrie
 Kottkethal
 Milroy
 Newport
 Norfolk
Norwich
 Rangeley
 Riga
 Rising
 Rose Hill
 Simcoe
Verendrye
 Willowdale
 Willow Vale
 Willow Valley
 Willow Creek

Townships

 Anamoose
 Balfour
 Bantry
 Berwick
 Bjornson
 Brown
 Cottonwood Lake
 Deep River
 Deering
 Denbigh
 Egg Creek
 Falsen
 Gilmore
 Granville
 Grilley
 Hendrickson
 Karlsruhe
 Kottke Valley
 Lake George
 Lake Hester
 Land
 Layton
 Lebanon
 Little Deep
 Meadow
 Mouse River
 Newport
 Normal
 North Prairie
 Norwich
 Odin
 Olivia
 Pratt
 Riga
 Rose Hill
 Round Lake
 Saline
 Schiller
 Spring Grove
 Strege
 Velva
 Villard
 Voltaire
 Wagar
 Willow Creek

Notable people
 Sondre Norheim, pioneer of modern skiing
 Cordell Volson, professional football player

Politics
McHenry County voters have traditionally voted Republican. In only one national election since 1936 has the county selected the Democratic Party candidate.

See also
 National Register of Historic Places listings in McHenry County, North Dakota

References

External links
 McHenry County JDA
 McHenry County maps, Sheet 1 (northern) and Sheet 2 (southern), North Dakota DOT

 
Minot, North Dakota micropolitan area
1884 establishments in Dakota Territory
Populated places established in 1884